The 13-Article Ordinance for the More Effective Governing of Tibet defined the political system of Tibet approved by the Qianlong Emperor of the Qing dynasty in 1751, the last imperial dynasty of China. 

In 1793, the 29-Article Ordinance for the More Effective Governing of Tibet was also published to define specific responsibilities of government officials including the Dalai Lama.

See also
List of Qing imperial residents in Tibet

References

History of Tibet
Law in Qing dynasty
Qianlong Emperor